The following lists events that happened during 2014 in Jordan.

Incumbents
Monarch: Abdullah II
Prime Minister: Abdullah Ensour

Events

March
 March 10 - A Jordanian judge is fatally shot by the Israeli Border Police after he allegedly attempted to grab one of their rifles.

April
 April 16 - Jordanian warplanes strike a convoy of vehicles as they were trying to enter Jordan from Syria.

December
 December 21 - After an eight-year informal moratorium on the death penalty, Jordan executes 11 men.
 December 24 - A Royal Jordanian Air Force warplane crashes, and its pilot is captured by Islamic State of Iraq and the Levant militants near the city of Raqqa in northern Syria.

References

 
2010s in Jordan
Jordan
Years of the 21st century in Jordan
Jordan